Diesel Loco Shed, Golden Rock is an engine shed located in Golden Rock, Tiruchirappalli, Tamil Nadu in India. It is located north of Golden Rock railway station, falling under Tiruchirappalli railway division. It is the largest of the four locomotive shed under the Southern Railway zone of Indian Railways.

History and developments 
The foundation stone for the shed was laid on the 25th of December, 1971 by the then Railway Minister, K. Hanumanthaiah.

The shed initially homed 45 of the YDM-4 class metre-gauge locomotives. Three subsequent expansions were taken up which resulted in the holding capacity being increased to 100 metre gauge locomotives (1998), 40 broad-gauge locomotives (1993) and 100 broad gauge locomotives (2000).

Infrastructure 
The shed was started as a metre-gauge shed. However with expansion over time, the bays and catwalks were converted from metre gauge to broad-gauge standards to home broad-gauge locomotives. The shed also houses a Diesel Traction and Training Centre (DTTC), opened on 7 April 1988, to impart theoretical and practical training for the newly recruited Assistant Loco Pilots, Engineers and other technical staffs. The centre only one of its kind in the zone also conducts periodical refresher courses for the in-service staffs of Indian Railways, and also too railway personnels from other countries. The DTTC along with Zonal Railway Training Institute (ZRTI), Trichy made a mark by imparting training to women, by which Narayana Vadivu and Jhansi Rani, became the first all women loco crew in the history of Southern Railway zone piloting a goods train on the Chord Line. With Indian Railways inching towards 100% Electrification Mission, two of its Old Metre Gauge bays were converted to New Electrified Broad Gauge ones. Electric Loco trials in these bays with an Erode Shed (EDDS) WAP-4 locomotive, numbered 22273, were conducted successfully on 3rd February 2022, with the commissioning of these E-locos expected anytime soon.

Operations 
The shed, headed by Senior Divisional Mechanical Engineer (Diesel), has about 750 employees in different ranks in the day-to-day operations of the shed, which include periodical overhaul, maintenance and repair works. The locos of this shed were thoroughly traverses over entire South India for passenger and freight services.

Locomotives

Awards 
The shed was adjudged the best shed among in the Southern Railway zone during 2012–2013. Also it won the "Performance Efficiency Shield" for the fifth time, since its inception in 2004–2005.

References

External links 
 
 

GOLDEN
1975 establishments in Tamil Nadu
Rail transport in Tiruchirappalli